Alonso is a crater in the southern hemisphere of Miranda, a moon of Uranus, located at 44° S, 352.6 ° E. It has a diameter of . The crater is named after Alonso, King of Naples, one of the characters in Shakespeare's The Tempest.

References

External links
 

Impact craters on Uranus' moons
Miranda (moon)